Kureh Chi (also Romanized as Kūreh Chī, Gūreh Chī, and Gūrchī; also known as Gūrchīn, Gurachhin, Gūrāchīn, and Gūrehchīn) is a village in Khomeh Rural District, in the Central District of Aligudarz County, Lorestan Province, Iran. At the 2006 census, its population was 338, in 52 families.

References 

Towns and villages in Aligudarz County